Mandhata Singh (born 18 July 1923 - 2000) was an Indian politician. He was elected to the Lok Sabha, the lower house of the Parliament of India from the Lucknow constituency of Uttar Pradesh in 1989 as a member of the Janata Dal.

References

External links
 Official biographical sketch in Parliament of India website

1923 births
Janata Dal politicians
Lok Sabha members from Uttar Pradesh
India MPs 1989–1991
2000 deaths
Politicians from Lucknow
Politicians from Ghazipur